Saguache Creek  (also spelled Saquache Creek) is a stream in Saguache County, Colorado.  The creek flows  from the confluence of its North and Middle forks before joining San Luis Creek. Saguache Creek is in the San Luis Closed Basin, the largest endorheic basin in Colorado.

See also
List of rivers of Colorado

References

Rivers of Colorado
Rivers of Saguache County, Colorado